Miss World 1995, the 45th edition of the Miss World pageant, was held on 18 November 1995 for the fourth straight year at the Sun City Entertainment Centre in Sun City, South Africa. The 1995 pageant attracted 84 delegates. The pageant was hosted by Richard Steinmetz, Jeff Trachta, and Bobbie Eakes and also involved supermodels Linda Evangelista and Beverly Peele and Bruce Forsyth who acted as presenters. Aside from Sun City; Dubai, United Arab Emirates, and the Comoros hosted some segments of the show. The winner was Jacqueline Aguilera of Venezuela. She was crowned by Miss World 1994, Aishwarya Rai of India.

Results

Placements

Continental Queens of Beauty

Contestants

  – Roshini Nibbs
  – María Lorena Jensen
  – Tessa Pieterz
  – Melissa Porter 
  – Elizabeth Unfried
  – Loleta Marie Smith
  – Yasmin Bilkis Sathi
  – Rashi Holder
  – Véronique De Kock
  – Renita Minors
  – Carla Patricia Morón Peña
  – Monica Somolekae
  – Elessandra Cristina Dartora
  – Chandi Trott
  – Evgenia Kalkandjieva
  – Alissa Lehinki
  – Tasha Ebanks
  – Tonka Tomicic Petric
  – Diana María Figueroa Castellanos
  – Shasling Navarro Aguilar
  – Anica Martinović
  – Danique Regales
  – Isabella Giorgallou
  – Katerina Kasalova
  – Tine Bay
  – Patricia Bayonet Robles
  – Ana Fabiola Trujillo Parker
  – Mari-Lin Poom
  – Terhi Koivisto
  – Helene Lantoine
  – Isabell Brauer
  – Manuela Medie
  – Monique Chiara
  – Maria Boziki
  – Joylyn Muñoz
  – Sara Elizabeth Sandoval Villatoro
  – Didi Schackmann
  – Shirley Chau Yuen-Yee 
  – Ildiko Veinbergen
  – Preeti Mankotia
  – Joanne Black
  – Miri Bohadana
  – Rosanna Santoli
  – Imani Duncan
  – Mari Kubo
  – Choi Yoon-young
  – Ieva Melina
  – Julia Syriani
  – Gabriele Bartkute
  – Geraldina Madeira da Silva Pedruco  – Trincy Low Ee Bing
  – Alejandra Quintero Velasco
  – Sarah Brady 
  – Inger Lise Ebeltoft
  – Marisela Moreno Montero
  – Patricia Serafini Geoghegan
  – Paola Dellepiane Gianotti
  – Reham Snow Tago
  – Ewa Izabella Tylecka
  – Suzana Leitao Robalo
  – Swanni Quiñones Laracuerte
  – Dana Delia Pintilie
  – Elena Bazina 
  – Shirley Low-Meng
  – Jacqueline Chew
  – Zuzana Spatinova
  – Teja Boškin
  – Bernelee Daniell
  – Candelaria Rodríguez Pacheco
  – Mandy Saulus
  – Jeanette Mona Hassel
  – Stephanie Berger
  – Timeri Baudry
  – Hsu Chun-Chun 
  – Emily Adolf Fred
  – Yasumin Leautamornwattana
  – Michelle Khan
  – Demet Sener
  – Nataliya Shvachiy
  – Shauna Marie Gunn
  – Jill Ankuda
  – Jacqueline María Aguilera Marcano
  – Miryana Bujisic
  – Dionne Best

Judges
Astrid Carolina Herrera – Miss World 1984 from Venezuela
Bruce Forsyth † 
Christopher Lee †
Eric Morley †
Emma Samms
Michael Winner †
Amitabh Bachchan
Fanie de Villiers
Josie Borain
Mariasela Alvarez – Miss World 1982 from Dominican Republic

Notes

Returns

Last competed in 1990:
 Last competed in 1992:
 Last competed in 1993:
  WithdrawalsWithdrawals during the contest:
  – Toyin Enitan Raji - She was forced to withdraw from the contest due political reasons; a few hours after being given the Miss Personality on 16 November, she received telephone threats over the execution by Nigeria's military regime of nine political activists a week ago.EBSCOhost ConnectionOthers:

   lost its franchise for Miss World until 1999.
      lost its franchise for Miss World until 1999.

Replacement
 ''' – The winner of Miss Ukraine 1995, Vlada Litovchenko couldn't participate due to the fact that she was a married woman with one child. The 2nd runner up of Miss Europe 1994, Nataliya Shvachiy replaced her.

References

External links
 Pageantopolis – Miss World 1995
 Miss World 1995 Delegates Gallery

Miss World
1995 in South Africa
1995 beauty pageants
Beauty pageants in South Africa
November 1995 events in Africa